Balaam and the Angel are a Scottish rock band founded by Mark, James (Jim), and Desmond (Des) Morris in Cannock, England in 1984.

Career
As children in Motherwell, Scotland, the Morris brothers worked in the entertainment industry as part of a cabaret act. They moved south to Cannock, Staffordshire, England. where they formed Balaam and the Angel.

Initially the band self-released a series of EP's and an album entitled Sun Family via their own Chapter 22 label and played some tour dates opening for The Cult. This caught the attention of Virgin Records, who signed them and released their debut album, The Greatest Story Ever Told. It peaked at No. 67 in the UK Albums Chart in August 1986. They toured in the United States with The Mission, Kiss and label mate Iggy Pop.

A second guitarist and the first non-sibling, Ian McKean of Twenty Flight Rockers, was added to the band in 1988. The band began to move away from gothic rock music styles into a sound that had more in common with hard rock. With their new-found style, they recorded the album Live Free or Die. This was soon followed up in similar style when they recorded Days of Madness, before leaving Virgin Records. Their song I'll Show You Something Special appeared on the soundtrack for the film, Planes, Trains and Automobiles.

Their presence was largely ignored by the time that their 1993 album, Prime Time, had failed to interest record buyers.

Members
Mark Morris - vocals, bass (1983–1989, 1991–present)
Jim Morris - guitar, keyboards (1983–1989, 1991–present)
Des Morris - drums (1983–1989, 1991–present)
Karen Morris - keyboards (2019–present)
Chris P Notes (Chris Williams) - keyboards (1994–2019)
Ian McKean - guitar (1988–1989, 1991–1994)

Discography

Albums

EPs

Singles

Compilation albums

See also
Reading and Leeds Festivals line-ups

References

External links
Balaam and the Angel Official website
Balaam and the Angel Official UK website

1984 establishments in England
British gothic rock groups
Musical groups established in 1984
Musical groups disestablished in 1989
Musical groups reestablished in 1991
Scottish rock music groups
Sibling musical groups